Surya Bhanu Pratap Singh (born 12 November 1995) is an Indian wushu practitioner from Jammu, Jammu and Kashmir. He won bronze at the 2015 World Wushu Championships in Jakarta and bronze at the 2017 World Wushu Championships in Kazan in the men's Sanda 60 kg category. 

He also won the gold medal at 2016 South Asian Games in the same category.

He represented India in Asian Games 2018, Jakarta and bagged bronze medal. As of 2016, Singh works with the Jammu and Kashmir Police.

References

1995 births
Living people
Indian sanshou practitioners
Sportspeople from Jammu and Kashmir
People from Jammu
Indian police officers
Wushu practitioners at the 2018 Asian Games
Medalists at the 2018 Asian Games
Asian Games bronze medalists for India
Asian Games medalists in wushu
South Asian Games gold medalists for India
South Asian Games medalists in wushu